Maymont is a village in the Canadian province of Saskatchewan within the Rural Municipality of Mayfield No. 406 and Census Division No. 16.

The village of Maymont was named for May Montgomery. She was a niece to  William Mackenzie (of Mackenzie and Mann, railway construction contractors, who built the Canadian Northern Railway through the area in 1905). Montgomery had asked her uncle to name the village Montgomery, but he said he could not because a town in Manitoba already had that name. So, he took her first name and the first syllable of her last name and combined them to form the name Maymont.

Like many other communities in Saskatchewan along the railway line in the early 1900s, Maymont had a grain elevator. Today, Maymont is one of the few towns in Saskatchewan that still has a grain elevator.

History 

Maymont incorporated as a village on June 24, 1907.

Demographics 

See also 

 List of communities in Saskatchewan
 Villages of Saskatchewan

References 

Villages in Saskatchewan
Mayfield No. 406, Saskatchewan
Division No. 16, Saskatchewan